Kobra Peak is near Bagh, Azad Kashmir.

References

Kashmir